Sanquelim or Sankhali is a town and municipal council in North Goa district in the Indian state of Goa.

Geography
Sanquelim is situated in the Bicholim Taluka of North Goa.
It is famous for 4 most important temples. First, Vitthal temple and second is Radha Krishna temple followed by third one Datta Mandir and then followed by Lord Shiva Rudreshwar temple. Sanquelim is also home to Sesa Football Academy. Also there is a beautiful waterfall.

Schools
  
Schools are as follows 
St. John of the Cross High School,
Progress High School,
V. P Gauns Memorial High School,
Shree Ganesh Vidyalaya.

Demographics
, Sanquelim had a population of 13,651. Males constitute 51.8% of the population and females 48.2%. Sanquelim has an average literacy rate of 91.5%, higher than the national average of 74.04%: male literacy is 94.22%, and female literacy is 91.48%. In Sanquelim, 10% of the population is under 6 years of age.

Government and politics
Sanquelim is part of Sanquelim (Goa Assembly constituency) and North Goa (Lok Sabha constituency).

References

Cities and towns in North Goa district